The Waychinicup River is located in the Great Southern region of Western Australia.

References

Rivers of the Great Southern region